The Federal Executive Council (FEC) is the cabinet of the Federal Republic of Nigeria and is part of the executive branch of the Government of Nigeria. The council's role, as written in the Ministers' Statutory Powers and Duties Act, is to serve as an advisory body to the President of Nigeria, who serves as the FEC's chairman. Members of the cabinet are appointed and report to the President, who can dismiss them at will. The cabinet currently consists of 24 Federal Ministries, each responsible for some aspect of providing government services, as well as a number of parastatals (government-owned corporations).

Relationship to civil service

The ministries and parastatals are staffed by career civil servants. Each is headed by a Permanent Secretary, a senior civil servant appointed by the Head of the Civil Service.
The Permanent Secretary is accountable to a Minister, who sits in the Cabinet and reports to the President. The Minister is appointed by the President subject to approval by the Senate and is responsible for policy, also while the Permanent Secretary is responsible for implementation of policy.

Confirmation Process 
The heads of the executive ministries are nominated by the President and then presented to the Senate. Section 147 (6) gives the Senate 21 days to complete the screening for confirmation or rejection by a simple majority. According to Section 147 (5) of the constitution the only qualification for one to be appointed as Minister is that the person must be “qualified for election into the House of Representatives”. If approved, they receive their commission scroll, are sworn in and then begin their duties.

Salary 
The heads of the executive departments and most other senior federal officers at cabinet or sub-cabinet level receive their salary under a fixed pay plan as reviewed by the Revenue Mobilisation Allocation and Fiscal Commission (RMAFC).
The annual basic salary of a substantive minister is ₦2,026,400 (₦168,866:66 per month).

Ministers and Ministers of State

By convention, there must be at least one Cabinet member from each of the 36 states in Nigeria, although there are only 28 ministries and at times the President takes direct control of a key ministry such as Petroleum Resources. To ensure representation from each state, a Minister is often assisted by one or more Ministers of State.

Current cabinet

Notes

See also
Nigerian Civil Service
Federal Ministries of Nigeria

References